Felix Manuel Rojas is a Puerto Rican writer, director, and producer from Bronx, New York. He is most famous for his play Growing Up Gonzales.

Career 
Rojas began his theatrical career at Syracuse University when he participated in the production of "Short Eyes" by Miguel Pinero. In the mid 1980s, Rojas was introduced to Marvin Felix Camillo, artistic director of The Family Repertory Company ("The Family"), who ultimately became Rojas' mentor.  The Family's primary focus was to create plays in English that were written by Hispanic writers that captured the experience of being raised in an urban environment.  Rojas was able to travel to Spain and Cuba with The Family as a writer, stage manager, and production manager. It was through The Family that Rojas was able to produce his first two original works, Hotel Presidential and From the Mind of Cheo.

After the production of Mandance, Rojas took a 17-year break from the industry to focus on raising his two sons, Felix Jr. and Nick. During his time away from the entertainment industry, Rojas served as a director of a Boys and Girls club. He worked in outreach for the homeless for five years before returning to the theater. In 2009, Rojas was introduced to a script-writing program by his youngest son, Nick. From then, Rojas began writing again and returned to the entertainment business in 2010 with a number of original works. One of his biggest works after his return was Growing Up Gonzales, which originally opened in the Pregones Theater in 2010 and has played on and off for the last 7 years throughout New York in The Jan Hus Playhouse, The Poet's Den Theater, and The Medicine Theater.

Rojas states that for him, inspiration is active. There is not one person that inspires him to write, rather it is the collection of constantly moving pieces of life such as music, food, children, and words. His primary goal when writing is to capture life not a genre.

Growing Up Gonzales 
Set in the Bronx during the 1970s, Growing Up Gonzales is a two act show following the life of two brothers, Johnny and Cisco. Johnny is tasked with cleaning out Cisco's apartment after he passes away. While cleaning, Johnny finds a box full of notepads full of stories that Cisco wrote down over the years. As Johnny reads through them, he discovers a different side of Cisco. Through the play, one is able to see the juxtaposed experiences of brothers growing up in the same environment but leading completely different lives. Growing Up Gonzales takes into consideration the audience members that may not speak Spanish and those who are not familiar with certain Puerto Rican customs and provides a comedic voice over prior to the commencement with definitions of terms that would be used throughout the performance.

El Conde y La Condesa 
With the combination of monologues and live music, El Conde y La Condesa tell the story of Cita Rodriguez, daughter of Pete "El Conde" Rodriguez who was a salsa legend that rose to fame in the 1970s. The one-woman show recounts moments that capture the love that Cita had for her father and the impact that their relationship had on her life. The show heavily relies on music to show the intense love and loyalty that are shared in this father-daughter relationship. It attracts not only theatergoers but also music lovers and salsa enthusiasts. The play was written in collaboration with Cita Rodriguez.

Papi's Promise 
Papi's Promise is a TV pilot that brings up the issue of domestic violence, taking responsibility and protecting one's children. The main character, Carlos Bonilla (played by Felix Rojas), loses his girlfriend to a sudden car accident and he is left to care for her fourteen-year-old son, Jay. However, after the death of his mother, Jay begins to act out and Carlo does not know how to deal with him. Jay calls his abusive biological father, who tries to convince Jay to go live with him. Social services takes Jay away from Carlo after the two were arrested for replacing the American flag with the Puerto Rican flag while intoxicated. The film shows the battle that Carlo went through to get Jay back and the personal and legal obstacles of being a parent to a child that is not biologically yours.

Works

Plays 
 Hotel Presidential
 Soy Chris
 From the Mind of Cheo
 Mandance

Films 
 On the Down Low
 A Place for Us
 Perfect Vision

Awards and nominations
 HOLA for Outstanding Achievement in play writing 
 Williamsburg International Film Festival for Outstanding Achievement in Filmmaking

References

Hispanic and Latino American dramatists and playwrights
Living people
1962 births